Ferenc Kiss (5 January 1942 – 8 September 2015) was a Hungarian wrestler who competed in the 1964 Summer Olympics, in the 1968 Summer Olympics, and in the 1972 Summer Olympics. He was born in Nick, Hungary.

References

External links 
 
 

1942 births
2015 deaths
Olympic wrestlers of Hungary
Wrestlers at the 1964 Summer Olympics
Wrestlers at the 1968 Summer Olympics
Wrestlers at the 1972 Summer Olympics
Hungarian male sport wrestlers
Olympic bronze medalists for Hungary
Olympic medalists in wrestling
Sportspeople from Vas County
Medalists at the 1972 Summer Olympics
20th-century Hungarian people
21st-century Hungarian people